

England
Head coach: Jack Rowell

 Rob Andrew
 Martin Bayfield
 Kyran Bracken
 Will Carling (c)
 Mike Catt
 Ben Clarke
 Jeremy Guscott
 Martin Johnson
 Jason Leonard
 Brian Moore
 Dewi Morris
 Steve Ojomoh
 Dean Richards
 Tim Rodber
 Graham Rowntree
 Victor Ubogu
 Rory Underwood
 Tony Underwood

France
Head coach: Pierre Berbizier

 Guy Accoceberry
 Louis Armary
 Abdelatif Benazzi
 Philippe Benetton
 Laurent Benezech
 Philippe Bernat-Salles
 Olivier Brouzet
 Laurent Cabannes
 Christian Califano
 Marc Cecillon
 Marc de Rougemont
 Yann Delaigue
 Christophe Deylaud
 Philippe Gallart
 Jean-Michel Gonzales
 Thierry Lacroix
 Olivier Merle
 Franck Mesnel
 Émile Ntamack
 Olivier Roumat
 Jean-Luc Sadourny
 Philippe Saint-André (c)
 Laurent Seigne
 Philippe Sella
 Sébastien Viars

Ireland
Head coach: Gerry Murphy

 Jonny Bell
 Michael Bradley
 Paul Burke
 Peter Clohessy
 David Corkery
 Ben Cronin
 Phil Danaher
 Eric Elwood
 Maurice Field
 Anthony Foley
 Neil Francis
 Gabriel Fulcher
 Mick Galwey
 Simon Geoghegan
 Eddie Halvey
 Niall Hogan
 Paddy Johns
 Terry Kingston
 Denis McBride
 Brendan Mullin (c)
 Conor O'Shea
 Nick Popplewell
 Jim Staples
 David Tweed
 Richard Wallace
 Keith Wood
 Niall Woods

Scotland
Head coach: Jim Telfer

 Stewart Campbell
 Craig Chalmers
 Damian Cronin
 Gavin Hastings (c)
 Scott Hastings
 David Hilton
 Ian Jardine
 Craig Joiner
 Kenny Logan
 John Manson
 Kenny Milne
 Iain Morrison
 Eric Peters
 Bryan Redpath
 Gregor Townsend
 Rob Wainwright
 Doddie Weir
 Peter Wright

Wales
Head coach: Alan Davies

 Matthew Back
 Tony Clement
 Richie Collins
 John D. Davies
 Nigel Davies
 Phil Davies
 Stuart Davies
 Ieuan Evans
 Ricky Evans
 Andrew Gibbs
 Mike Griffiths
 Michael Hall
 Simon Hill
 Garin Jenkins
 Neil Jenkins
 Spencer John
 Derwyn Jones
 Robert Jones
 Emyr Lewis
 Gareth Llewellyn (c)
 Rupert Moon
 Wayne Proctor
 Hemi Taylor
 Mark Taylor
 Nigel Walker
 Huw Williams-Jones

External links

Six Nations Championship squads